Ann C. Palmenberg is a professor of virology and biochemistry at the University of Wisconsin-Madison. She received her B.S. from St. Lawrence University and her Ph.D. from the University of Wisconsin-Madison. Dr. Palmenberg has been given numerous awards for her research and involvement within the scientific community, such as Fellow for the American Academy of Microbiology. News articles have been published about her work within virology, including an article in the Milwaukee Journal Sentinel on her findings on the common cold.

Leadership & Service
Reviewer for Journal of Virology, Archives of Virology, Virology, Cell, Journal of Molecular Biology, EMBO Journal, PNAS, Science, Nature, Virus Research, and Biochemistry journals from 1975–Present

Awards
Ann Palmenberg has received several awards within the science community for her achievements, including the following: 
Made a Fellow of the American Academy of Microbiology in 2009
Elected as President for the American Society for Virology in 2007
Awarded the Distinguished Scientist Award from the University of Nebraska-Lincoln in 2006
Awarded an American Society for Virology Lifetime Membership in 2001
Elected Chair for the Institute of Molecular Virology at the University of Wisconsin-Madison from 1997-2013
Awarded the WARF Faculty Mid-Career Award from the University of Wisconsin-Madison in 1997
Awarded the Vilas Associate Award from the University of Wisconsin-Madison in 1996
Awarded the H.I. Romnes Faculty Research Award from the University of Wisconsin-Madison in 1991
Awarded the Pound Research Award from the University of Wisconsin-Madison in 1990
Awarded the Distinguished Scientist Award from the Waksman Institute of Rutgers University in 1989
Commended by Pan American Foot-and-Mouth Disease Center for Work in the Control and Eradication Programs in South America in 1988

Publications
The following are the most notable of her 93 publications for which Ann Palmenberg has been a major contributor.
The Atomic Structure of Mengo Virus at 3.0 A Resolution
Proteolytic Processing of Picornaviral Polyprotein 
Sequencing and Analyses of All Known Human Rhinovirus Genomes Reveal Structure and Evolution
Sequence and Structural Elements that Contribute to Efficient Encephalomyocarditis Virus RNA Translation
The Nucleotide and Deduced Amino Acid sequences of the Encephalomyocarditis Viral Polyprotein Coding Region

References

Living people
Year of birth missing (living people)
American virologists
American microbiologists
Women microbiologists
University of Wisconsin–Madison faculty
St. Lawrence University alumni
University of Wisconsin–Madison alumni
Scientists from New York (state)